Colaspis viridiceps is a species of leaf beetle from North America. Its range spans from Arizona to New Mexico and south to Mexico. It was first described by the American entomologist Charles Frederic August Schaeffer in 1933.

Subspecies
There are two subspecies of C. viridiceps:
 Colaspis viridiceps australis Blake, 1976
 Colaspis viridiceps viridiceps Schaeffer, 1933

References

Further reading

 

Eumolpinae
Articles created by Qbugbot
Beetles described in 1933
Beetles of North America
Taxa named by Charles Frederic August Schaeffer